

List of transactions

Retirement

Front office movements

Head coach changes

Team Manager

Player Movement

Trades

Free Agency Signings

  Signing packages that included a car and a condominium unit.
  Option to retire after his first year of contract.

Rookie signings

Released

Waived

2015 PBA draft

References

transactions
transactions, 2015-16